The Peters Paper Company Warehouse, in Denver, Colorado, has been listed on the National Register of Historic Places since 1988.  It was built in 1899, expanded in 1915, and served as a paper company warehouse until 1942.

It is a four- and five-story building with a post and beam structural system and with facing of beige brick.  It has a pressed metal cornice and a flat roof.  The original part, built in 1899, is four stories, and fills two lots.  A 1915 addition on a third lot on the north side has five stories but is the same height, and is tied in by the cornice and by windows having the same design.  The construction of both parts was designed and/or supervised by architects Gove and Walsh.

References

Warehouses
Commercial buildings on the National Register of Historic Places in Colorado
Commercial buildings completed in 1899
1899 establishments in Colorado
National Register of Historic Places in Denver